Roman Kulesza (born 2 March 1983) is a Polish gymnast. He competed at the 2012 Summer Olympics, where he finished 24th in the all around.

References

External links
 

1983 births
Living people
Polish male artistic gymnasts
Olympic gymnasts of Poland
Gymnasts at the 2012 Summer Olympics
Sportspeople from Gdańsk
European Games competitors for Poland
Gymnasts at the 2015 European Games